Tell Tarby was a British television comedy series which aired in 1973. Cast included Jimmy Tarbuck, Lynda Bellingham, Josephine Tewson, Stanley Unwin and Frank Williams. All six episodes are missing, believed lost.

References

External links
Tell Tarby on IMDb

1973 British television series debuts
1973 British television series endings
Lost television shows
English-language television shows
1970s British comedy television series